Small and Medium Enterprise Development Agency of Nigeria (SMEDAN) director-general is Umar Dikko Radda.

Foreign relationship 

On February 9, 2013, SMEDAN signed a memorandum of understanding (MoU) with Ministry of Industry of Indonesia's Directorate-General of Small and Medium Industries (SMI). The MoU is for cooperation in enterprises development between the two countries and inviting Indonesian investors to Nigeria.

History 
On the 1st of March, 2018, Femi Pedro was appointed by President Muhammadu Buhari as the Chairman, Board of Directors of the Small and Medium Enterprises Development Agency of NIgeria (SMEDAN).

See also 

 Umar Dikko Radda
 Femi Pedro

External link 

 https://smedan.gov.ng/

References 

Economy of Nigeria
Organizations related to small and medium-sized enterprises